Joshua Brian Little (born 1 November 1999) is an Irish cricketer. He made his international debut for the Ireland cricket team in September 2016. He became the first Irish player to bag an Indian Premier League contract after Gujarat Titans brought him in auction ahead of 2023 season.

International career
Little made his Twenty20 International (T20I) debut against Hong Kong on 5 September 2016. Little was 16 years old at the time of his debut, making him the second-youngest to have played at that level, after Hong Kong's Waqas Khan. Prior to his T20I debut, Little was named in Ireland's squad for the 2016 Under-19 Cricket World Cup.

Little was originally named in Ireland's T20I squad for their series against Afghanistan in India in March 2017. However, he had to withdraw because of education commitments. In December 2017, he was named in Ireland's squad for the 2018 Under-19 Cricket World Cup.

In January 2019, Little was named in Ireland's T20I squads for the Oman Quadrangular Series and the series against Afghanistan in India. In April 2019, he was named in Ireland's One Day International (ODI) squads for the one-off match against England and the 2019 Ireland Tri-Nation Series. He made his ODI debut for Ireland against England on 3 May 2019.

On 10 July 2020, Little was named in Ireland's 21-man squad that travelled to England to start training behind closed doors for the ODI series against the England cricket team.

In February 2021, Little was named in the Ireland Wolves' squad for their tour to Bangladesh. In September 2021, Little was named in Ireland's provisional squad for the 2021 ICC Men's T20 World Cup.

Domestic and T20 career
Little made his List A debut for Leinster Lightning in the 2018 Inter-Provincial Cup on 19 June 2018. He made his first-class debut for Leinster Lightning in the 2018 Inter-Provincial Championship on 20 June 2018. In April 2019, he was one of five cricketers to be awarded with an Emerging Player Contract by Cricket Ireland, ahead of the 2019 domestic season.

In July 2019, Little was selected to play for the Dublin Chiefs in the inaugural edition of the Euro T20 Slam cricket tournament. However, the following month the tournament was cancelled. In November 2021, he was selected to play for the Dambulla Giants following the players' draft for the 2021 Lanka Premier League.

On 31 August, Little achieved the best bowling figures in the history of The Hundred of 5/13. He is the fourth person to obtain a 5 wicket haul in the history of the competition sending Manchester Originals into the top three on the final day and into the playoffs.

On 4 November 2022, in a match against New Zealand in the 2022 T20 Cricket World Cup, Little took a hat-trick by dismissing Kane Williamson, James Neesham and Mitchell Santner. In December 2022, Gujarat Titans brought Little in the Indian Premier League auction ahead of 2023 season. This made him the first ever Irish player to get an IPL contract.

References

External links
 

1999 births
Living people
Irish cricketers
Ireland One Day International cricketers
Ireland Twenty20 International cricketers
Leinster Lightning cricketers
Dambulla Aura cricketers
Cricketers from Dublin (city)
Manchester Originals cricketers